Fred Goldsmith may refer to:

 Fred Goldsmith (American football) (born 1944), American college football coach
 Fred Goldsmith (Australian footballer) (1932–2017), Brownlow Medal winning footballer
 Fred Goldsmith (baseball) (1856–1939), American baseball pitcher

See also
 Frederick Goldsmith, bishop
 Frederick Goldsmid, MP